This was the first edition of the tournament, Máximo González won the title defeating Diego Schwartzman in the final 3–6, 7–5, 6–4.

Seeds

Draw

Finals

Top half

Bottom half

References
 Main Draw
 Qualifying Draw

Corrientes Challenger - Singles